Švihov may refer to places in the Czech Republic:

Švihov (Klatovy District), a town in the Plzeň Region
Švihov Castle in the town
Švihov (Rakovník District), a municipality and village in the Central Bohemian Region
Švihov, a village and part of Drslavice (Prachatice District) in the South Bohemian Region
Švihov, a village and part of Miřetice (Chrudim District) in the Pardubice Region